Mu Pai Nai was a Jianzhou Jurchen leader who invaded the north of Joseon, but was defeated by Yi Sun-sin and his army in 1583. Right after his capture, he was executed by Yi Sun-sin.

External links
 https://web.archive.org/web/20091026202723/http://geocities.com/yi_sun_shin_adm/yisunshin.html

Manchu people